Ulcinj is a town on the southern coast of Montenegro and the capital of Ulcinj Municipality. It has an urban population of 10,707 (2011), the majority being Albanians.

As one of the oldest settlements in the Adriatic coast, it was founded in 5th century BC. It was captured by the Romans in 163 BC from the Illyrians. With the division of the Roman Empire, it became part of the Byzantine Empire. It was known as a base for piracy.

During the Middle Ages it was under South Slavic rule for a few centuries. In 1405 it became part of the Republic of Venice.

In 1571 Ulcinj was conquered by the Ottoman Empire with the aid of North African corsairs after the Battle of Lepanto. The town was renamed Ülgün and gradually became a Muslim-majority settlement. Under the Ottomans, numerous oriental-style hammams, mosques, and clock towers were built. Ulcinj remained a den of piracy until this was finally put to an end by Mehmed Pasha Bushati. In 1673, the self-proclaimed Jewish Messiah Sabbatai Zevi was exiled here from Istanbul.

The Venetians attempted to capture the town twice, in 1696 and 1718, but were unsuccessful on both occasions.

During the 19th century, the town began to regain its position as a flourishing port. The geographer Antonio Baldacci reported a merchant marine of 500 ships plying the trade routes between the Adriatic and Mediterranean coasts.

Ulcinj remained an Ottoman town for more than 300 years until it was ceded to the Principality of Montenegro in 1878. It is a former medieval Catholic bishopric and remains a Latin titular see.

Ulcinj is a destination for tourists, because of its Long Beach, Lake Šas, Ada Bojana Island and for its two-millennia-old Ulcinj Castle. There are 26 mosques in the town and surrounding countryside. Ulcinj is the centre of the Albanian community in Montenegro.

Names 
Early historian Livy (59 BC–AD 17) mentioned it, as did Pliny the Elder (23–79), who mentioned it as Olcinium, its old name Colchinium, "founded by [settlers from] Colchis" (Olchinium quod antea Colchinium dictum est a Colchis conditum). Ptolemy (90–168) mentions the city as Greek Oulkinion (Ουλκίνιον). Although the ancient writers preferred a connection with Cholchis, the name of the settlement appears to be connected with the Albanian word ujk or ulk (meaning wolf in English), from Proto-Albanian *(w)ulka, from Proto-Indo-European *wĺ̥kʷos. In modern Albanian, it is known as Ulqin.

Geography

Neighbourhoods 
Çarshia (mn. Čaršija), is a neighbourhood and town centre which connects the old and new parts (neighbourhoods). In 2009 it was reconstructed, with the asphalt being changed into sett and the water and electrical system were changed. The neighbourhood has some 200 shops. It has an oriental atmosphere. There are two mosques located in this area, the Namazgjahu Mosque and Kryepazari Mosque.

History

Antiquity 
Ulcinj is an ancient seaport. The wider area of Ulcinj has been inhabited since the Bronze Age, based on dating of Illyrian tombs (tumuli) found in the village of Zogaj, in the vicinity of Ulcinj. The town is believed to have been founded in the 5th century BC by colonists from Colchis, as mentioned in the 3rd century BC poem by Apollonius of Rhodes. Illyrians lived in the region at the time as there are traces of immense Cyclopean walls still visible in the old Citadel.

All the way in the pre-medieval period, Ulcinj was known as one of the pirate capitals of the Adriatic Sea. This is also seen during the later period of Illyrian Kingdom. Inhabitants of Ulcinj were known before time of Christ, especially from 20 BC to around 300 AD, to be very confrontational to those who were foreigners to their land; they were especially meticulous about border disputes as well.

Roman 

In 168 BC, during the Third Illyrian War, Olcinium broke with Gentius and defected to the Romans (Livy 45:26:2). Under Roman rule the town received the status of oppidum civium Romanorum (settlement of Roman citizens), only to be later granted municipium (independent town) status. A section of their re-fortification can be distinguished from the Illyrio-Greek by the rustication of the walls.

The Periplus Maris Erythraei names several Indian ports from where large ships sailed in an easterly direction to Khruse (Kruče - seaside village in Ulcinj).

After the division of the Roman Empire, Ulcinj became a part of the Byzantine province of Prevalis and the population converted to Christianity. From Medieval times, and quiet likely earlier, it was regarded as an important trading and maritime center and still maintained the status of city autonomy. From circa 820, the city was the see of a Diocese of Ulcinj, which was only suppressed in 1532, and would be revived as a Latin titular bishopric.

Medieval period 
In the 9th century, it was in the Dyrrhachium theme, a military governorate of the Byzantine Empire. In 1010, Tsar Samuel of Bulgaria (r. 997-1014†) failed to conquer the town during the war against the Byzantines.
 
By 1040, archon Stefan Vojislav of Duklja conquered the region. In 1183, Serbian Prince Stefan Nemanja conquered Olcinium and the town prospered as one of the most significant coastal towns. Ulcinj remained in Nemanjić hands in their Kingdom and Empire, and after the death of Emperor Dušan (r. 1331-1355†), the region, known as Lower Zeta, was under the supervision of gospodin Žarko, a voivode of Emperor Uroš the Weak until his death in 1360. Žarko's lands were then held by the Balšić family. Under Balšić control, Ulcinj continued to be an important town and also minted coins. The Balšić Tower in the upper part of the Old Town was built by the Balšić noble family in the late 14th century.

Venetian and Ottoman rule 

In 1405 the Venetians conquered the town. Under Venetian control, the city was renamed Dulcigno in Italian, and it was incorporated in the Albania Veneta. The Venetians maintained control until 1571, when the Ottoman Turks conquered Dulcigno with the help of Barbary pirates, who didn't leave the town after conquering. It was renamed Ülgün and remained within the Ottoman domain for over 300 years, during which time its far-reaching reputation as a lair of pirates was established.According to historian Luigi Paulucci at the time of the Venetians the town was half Albanian, a quarter Venetian and one quarter Slavic.

In the 17th century a self-proclaimed Jewish Messiah named Sabbatai Zevi caused turmoil throughout the Turkish Empire with his evangelizing, which attracted thousands of followers. He was eventually captured and exiled to Ulcinj in 1666, where he died quietly ten years later. He was buried in the courtyard of a Muslim house which is still preserved as a mausoleum; along with two Jewish altars in the Balšic Tower.

In 1867, Ulcinj became a kaza of the İşkodra sanjak of Rumeli veyalet. After the Congress of Berlin in 1878, borders between Montenegro and the Ottoman Empire were redrawn, with Plav and Gusinje being ceded to Montenegro. But Muslim Albanian resistance prevented the Montenegrins from taking over Plav and Gusinje, so the Great Powers in 1880 decided to reverse the territorial transfer and offered Ulcinj to Montenegro as compensation.

After the city's annexation to Montenegro, of its 8,000-strong population about 3,000 Albanians left and settled elsewhere in northern Albania. 142 Montenegrin families were brought to settle in the outskirts of Ulcinj in the 1880s. The population of Ulcinj steadily decreased until the post-WWII period.

20th century to present 

Ulcinj became a part of the Kingdom of Montenegro from 1878 until 1918 when Montenegro was absorbed into the Kingdom of Serbia for a short time before all would be incorporated into the first of the Yugoslav federations at the end of the year. Ulcinj remained within a Montenegrin entity whilst a South Slavic state had existed until 2006 when which it became part of an independent Montenegro following a referendum.

During the 20th century, Ulcinj survived heavy declines and new ascents. Ulcinj was the second biggest town of Montenegro when it joined the kingdom in 1880. In just three decades, it backslided to 6th place for economic development and number of inhabitants (after Podgorica, Niksic, Cetinje, Tivar and Plava). During World War I Ulcinj was conquered by Austria-Hungary in 1916 and Italy on November 4, 1918, and since 1920 it was part of the Serbo-Croatian-Slovenian Kingdom, later known as the Kingdom of Yugoslavia.

As the southernmost city of the coast of the Kingdom of Yugoslavia, Ulcinj had a strong turnaround in the 1930s with the development of the tourist industry. At that time hotels were built such as Krištja, Republic, Jadran and Koop (later Galeb). 
World War II halted economic momentum. From 1941 to 1944, Ulcinj was under the Albanian administration. On November 7, 1943, Ulcinj was bombarded by Allied forces, with over 46 people  killed and many more injured. The Yugoslav Partisans took Ulcinj on November 26, 1944, and the city become part of Socialist Yugoslavia.

The 1950s and 1960s marked the greatest period of economic development for Ulcinj, with the construction of a range of modern hotels in the city and the Great Plain, as well as major economic collectives (NHT "Riviera of Ulcinj", "Agroulqini", Primary Building Company, "Otrantkomerc", "Ultep" and others). In the catastrophic earthquake on April 15, 1979, the city was severely damaged, but after only a few years, with the solidarity of the citizens of entire Yugoslavia, it was quickly renovated. Ulcinj at the end of the eighties had about 40 percent of the tourist turnover in Montenegro, while two-thirds of the guests were foreign, mostly German.

During the Kosovo War, in 1998 and 1999, thousands of Kosovo Albanians flocked to Ulcinj and its surroundings, where they were welcomed in the best possible conditions by the ethnic Albanian population of Ulcinj and the surrounding area.

Population 

Ulcinj is the administrative centre of Ulcinj Municipality, which has a population of 19,921. The town of Ulcinj itself has a population of 10,707. Ulcinj Municipality is the centre of the Albanian community in Montenegro. It is one of two municipalities in Montenegro where Albanians form the majority with 70%, the other being Tuzi with a 68% majority.

Ethnicity, language and religion 
The majority ethnic group in Ulcinj are Albanians. The largest spoken language is Albanian.

Population by ethnicity (2011 census):

Population by mother tongue (2011 census):

Population by religion (2011 census):

Tourism 

Ulcinj is a tourist destination in summer. In January 2010, the New York Times named ranked the south coast region of Montenegro, featuring Velika Plaza, Ada Bojana, and the Hotel Mediteran, as one of "The Top 31 Places to Go in 2010".

Although Ulcinj is still undiscovered by many travelers from larger countries, repeat tourists and an increasing amount of first-time visitors make it a hot spot for vacationers between the months of May and September. It is most famous for its sandy beaches. There is a small pebble beach called Ladies Beach which folk tradition holds to have qualities conducive to fertility.

There is also a beach called Mala Plaža (Albanian: Plazhi i Vogël; English: Small Beach) which is much smaller in size, but is located in the centre of town and very popular with visitors. "The Korzo", as it is called by locals, is a promenade which separates a street lined with coffee shops from Mala plaža. At night during the summer months, the Korzo is pedestrianised and families and young people gather. There are many more less known smaller beaches that serve as get-aways from the main tourist areas. Ulcinj has also a large number of religious buildings like mosques, türbes and churches, including Pasha's Mosque, Sailors' Mosque and St. Nicholas' Church.

Ulcinj's old town is a well preserved castle-looking community that is left over from medieval times. The old town sits atop a mountain overlooking the shore and is a tourist attraction on its own. Ada Bojana (Albanian: Buna) is popular among foreign tourists from Western Europe for its peace and atmosphere. A large naturist campsite is located in Ada Bojana. Lake Šas and Ulcinj's salt pond are visited by birdwatchers, because Ulcinj and its surroundings are major resting points for over 200 bird species on their migration paths. There are numerous cafés, discos, and bars that dot the city that are usually filled to capacity throughout the summer. The majority of tourists that visit Ulcinj are Albanians, Serbians, Croatians, Bosnians, Slovenians, Macedonians, Russians, Ukrainians, and other Europeans.

Education

Sports and recreation
The Ulcinj "south coast" region is well known for its active sports, recreation possibilities and hunting . Kitesurfing at Ada Bojana, all manner of water sports at Velika plaža, scuba diving among wrecks and sunken cities, mountain biking, hiking, orienteering, cycling through the olive groves at Valdanos, long walks along the pristine beaches of the south coast of Montenegro, even deep sea fishing on the Adriatic, lake fishing at Lake Skadar, and river fishing in Ada Bojana,  Due to the fact that the favorable habitat for wild life, has excellent conditions of hunting tourism. This place is the haven of ornithological (gourmand) hunting in Reč and Shenkol most common wildlife are woodcock, Hare, Wild boar, and ducks.

List of sport clubs in Ulcinj:

Climate 
Ulcinj has a Mediterranean climate (Csa) in the Köppen climate classification. Winters are cool and very rainy, and summers are hot and humid with possible afternoon thunder showers. Unlike Podgorica which is located inland, temperatures rarely exceed  and seldom drop below .

Transport 
 
Ulcinj is connected with the rest of Montenegro by a two-lane highway. It is connected with other coastal towns by the Adriatic Motorway. Reaching inland is made possible by detouring from the Adriatic Motorway at Budva or Sutomore (through the Sozina tunnel).

As of today, there are no airports in the city of Ulcinj. There are regular flights to Belgrade and Zürich from Tivat. Podgorica Airport has regular flights to major Europe and destinations throughout the year. Many tourists traveling to Ulcinj from abroad arrive to the city from the airport in Tivat due to its recent renovations and general ease of navigation. There are also intercity buses that connect to other towns in the country and buses that go to Serbia, Albania, Northern Macedonia, Greece, and Germany (during tourist seasons) as well Flex bus operates in this area connecting to Bana Luka (Bosnia) and Dubrovnik.

International relations 

Ulcinj is a founding member of the Union of Albanian Municipalities in the Region. Ulcinj is twinned with:

 Berat, Albania
 Deçan, Kosovo
 Liesing (Vienna), Austria
 Lukavac, Bosnia and Herzegovina
 Serik, Turkey

 Stari Grad (Sarajevo), Bosnia and Herzegovina
 Uzhhorod, Ukraine

Cooperation and friendship
Ulcinj also cooperates with:
 Durrës, Albania

Notable people
Đurađ II Balšić, Lord of Zeta from 1385 to 1403, member of the Balšić noble family.
Dritan Abazović, prime minister of Montenegro
Jelena Balšić, daughter of Lazar of Serbia, author of Gorički zbornik, first woman writer in South Slavs
Gjon Buzuku, Catholic priest who wrote the first known printed book in Albanian
Pjetër Gjoka, actor and People's Artist of Albania
Rizo Šurla, photographer, and actor of African descent
John VIII or Giovanni Bruni, archbishop of Bar (1551–1571)
Adrian Lulgjuraj, Montenegrin-Albanian singer
Ndoc Martini, painter
Alex Rudaj, Albanian-American mobster
Lika Ceni, Captain and Pirate Commander
Rade Tovladijac, Serbian comic book artist
Mark Gjonaj, Albanian-American politician
Mujo Ulqinaku, Albanian officer and a People's Hero of Albania
Sabbatai Zevi, İzmir born mystic, founder of the Jewish Sabbatean movement
Andrej Nikolaidis, writer
Cafo Beg Ulqini, Leader of Second League of Prizren and Knight of the Order of Skandebeg
Božidar Đurašković, athlete
Vladimir Mihailović, basketball player
 Gazmend Çitaku is an Albanian Montenegrin photographer, publisher, and librarianGazmend_Çitaku

Bibliography

References

Sources

 
Populated places in Ulcinj Municipality
Mediterranean port cities and towns in Montenegro
Illyrian Montenegro
Cities in ancient Illyria
Greek colonies in Illyria
Gegëri